Gérard de la Martinière (born 1943) is a French businessman.

A graduate of École polytechnique (X1963) and ENA, he was a general inspector of Finances, working in the Ministry of Finances from 1969 to 1984.

He joined AXA in 1989 and was director-general for finances, control and strategy, and a member of the direction board (directoire).

Since 2003, and for a mandate of 3 years, he is head of the French federation of insurance companies.

External links
  Biography

École Polytechnique alumni
École nationale d'administration alumni
1943 births
Living people